Mack Rides GmbH & Co KG, also known simply as Mack Rides, is a German company that designs and constructs amusement rides, based in Waldkirch, Baden-Württemberg. It is one of the world's oldest amusement industry suppliers, and builds many types of rides, including flat rides, dark rides, log flumes, tow boat rides and roller coasters. The family that owns Mack Rides also owns Europa-Park.

History

1780s–1950s
Mack Rides traces its roots back to 1780 when Paul Mack, a young entrepreneur, started building carriages and stagecoaches. The Mack Company began building organ wagons and caravans for travelling showmen in 1880, commencing the company's involvement in the amusement industry. Its first wooden roller coaster was built in 1921, the first car ride in 1936, and the first wooden bobsled ride in 1951. By 1952 Mack Rides started increasing its exports of rides to the U.S. market.

1950s–present 
 

Europa-Park is run by the Mack family. Franz Mack (1921–2010) in 1958 took over the family firm, Mack GmbH & Co (now Mack Rides), together with his brothers. With his son Roland (b. 1949), he visited the United States in 1972 and was inspired to open a theme park in Germany, as an exhibition site for his company's products.

At first the park was to be located in Breisach. It was named "Europa-Park" after Breisach's nearby Europaweiher, a small artificial lake that commemorates a historical pilot poll in Breisach held in 1950, in which 95.6% of voters were in favour of European unification. The Breisach site was deemed unsuitable because of flooding hazard, and the project was moved 30 km north, where the Macks bought the park of the historical Balthasar castle in Rust.

Europa-Park opened in 1975 with an area of 16 hectares. It had 250,000 visitors in its first year, 700,000 in the second, then passed one million in 1978.

List of roller coasters

As of February 2022, Mack Rides has built 156 roller coasters around the world.

List of other attractions

References

External links

Amusement ride manufacturers
Companies based in Baden-Württemberg
Roller coaster manufacturers
Manufacturing companies established in 1780
Europa-Park
1780 establishments in Europe